This is a list of computer and video games that are set in the Old West or that are defined by a Western style, including those that blend Western elements with other genres, such as Space Westerns.

Traditional Westerns

Non-traditional Westerns 
This section is for Western games that have non-traditional themes or hybrid genres such as Space Western, Sci-fi West, Fantasy Western, Hybrid Western (e.g. Horror Western, Film noir, Martial arts (genre), anthropomorphic animal characters), neo-Western (Contemporary settings/times), Post-apocalyptic West, Weird West (Also can have supernatural, steampunk, superhero themes), among many others. It is probably okay to leave 'spaghetti westerns' and some other mixed genres in the traditional section.
See this List of Western subgenres for a comprehensive rundown on numerous types of alternate Westerns.

Cancelled games

References

External Links 
 Setting: Western / Old West at MobyGames
 Non-traditional Westerns at MobyGames

Western
 List of Western computer and video games